Bhavna Pani is an Indian actress, model and dancer. She is trained in classical dance forms  Odissi and Kathak, as well as in ballet and contemporary modern dance. She debuted in films in 2001 with Tere Liye.

Career 
Bhavna Pani was born and brought up in Mumbai, India. She is the daughter of ad filmmaker Uday Shankar Pani. She has a younger sister Devna Pani who is a fashion designer and actress. She did her BA in Psychology and Philosophy from Mithibai College, Mumbai.

She is trained in Odissi and Kathak by Kelucharan Mohapatra and Birju Maharaj. She has learned contemporary dance at Terrence Lewis Contemporary Dance Company and is also trained in Jazz and Ballet.

She started her career with her first Bollywood film Tere Liye, at the age of 16. Since then, she has acted in many films including the Puri Jagannadh directed Kannada film Yuvaraja (2001), R. Srinivas directed Telugu film Ninu Choodaka Nenundalenu ( 2002 )and Priyadarshan’s Malayalam comedy film Vettam. She has also expressed that she likes to do more romantic comedy films.

She has been performing as the lead dancer in Sahara India’s ambitious production Bharti for over ten years. She won Mahindra Excellence in Theatre Award for Best Supporting Actress for So Many Socks.

Filmography

References

External links 

Yahoo Movies India Interview

Indian film actresses
Living people
Year of birth missing (living people)
Actresses in Hindi cinema
Actresses from Mumbai
Actresses in Malayalam cinema
Actresses in Telugu cinema
Actresses in Kannada cinema